The 2003–04 Coupe de la Ligue was the 10th edition of the French league cup competition. The competition was organized by the Ligue de Football Professionnel and was open to the 40 professional clubs in France that are managed by the organization.

Monaco were the reigning champions, having defeated Sochaux 4–1 in the previous season's final. The previous season's finalists Sochaux returned to the final, defeating Nantes 5–4 on penalties to claim their first Coupe de la Ligue.

Round of 16
The matches were contested on 16 and 17 December 2003.

Quarter-finals
The quarter-finals were contested on 13 and 14 January 2004.

Semi-finals
The semi-finals were contested on 3 and 4 February 2015.

Final

The final was held on 17 April 2004 at the Stade de France, Saint-Denis.

See also
 2003–04 Ligue 1
 2003–04 Ligue 2

References

Coupe de la Ligue seasons
France
League Cup